Chan Pi-han (born 27 April 1992) is a Taiwanese footballer who plays as a midfielder. She has been a member of the Chinese Taipei women's national team.

International career
Chan Pi-han capped for Chinese Taipei at senior level during two AFC Women's Asian Cup qualifications (2014 and 2018), the 2016 AFC Women's Olympic Qualifying Tournament, the 2017 EAFF E-1 Football Championship and the 2018 Asian Games.

International goals

References

1992 births
Living people
Footballers from Kaohsiung
Taiwanese women's footballers
Women's association football midfielders
Chinese Taipei women's international footballers
Asian Games competitors for Chinese Taipei
Footballers at the 2018 Asian Games